Hrangbana College is located at Chanmari, Aizawl, Mizoram.  Hrangbana College admits the most students in Mizoram: 850.

History
The college is named after Hrangbana, a late philanthropist and prominent businessman who generously donated a sum of Rs. one lakh to start the college. It was given government recognition as a private college on 6 November 1980 and was upgraded to Deficit Grant-in-aid Status with effect from 1 September 1985. It finally became a Government College with effect from 1 April 2003.

Accreditation
Affiliated to the NEHU until 2002, the college was one of the prominent members of the NEHU family. Hrangbana College is affiliated to Mizoram University. It is graded B++ status by NAAC.

Departments
The college offers Bachelor of Arts and Bachelor of Commerce (General and Honors).

See also
Education in India
Education in Mizoram
Mizoram University
Literacy in India

References

External links
 

Universities and colleges in Mizoram
Colleges affiliated to Mizoram University
Education in Aizawl